The 18th European Film Awards were presented on December 3, 2005 in Berlin, Germany. The winners were selected by the members of the European Film Academy.

Winners and nominees

References

External links 
 European Film Academy Archive

2005 film awards
European Film Awards ceremonies
2005 in German cinema
2005 in Europe